Samuel Spiby (1877–1953) was an English footballer who made one appearance in the Football League for Glossop as an inside left.

Personal life 
Spiby served in the King’s (Liverpool Regiment) and the Manchester Regiment during the First World War. He was court-martialed at Altcar Camp, Merseyside in July 1916 and finished the war as a private in the Labour Corps.

References

English Football League players
British Army personnel of World War I
Glossop North End A.F.C. players
Association football inside forwards
1877 births
1953 deaths
Footballers from Ashton-under-Lyne
King's Regiment (Liverpool) soldiers
Manchester Regiment soldiers
Royal Pioneer Corps soldiers
English footballers
British Army personnel who were court-martialled
Military personnel from Lancashire